Mircea Druc (born 25 July 1941) is a Moldovan and Romanian politician who served as Prime Minister of Moldova between 26 May 1990 and 22 May 1991.

He was appointed as Prime Minister after the opposition walked out from the Parliament, as a protest to the policies of the nationalist Popular Front of Moldova.

His government purged non-Moldovans from cultural institutions and changed the outlook of the education system to be centred towards Romanian-language education, away from the Russian-centric education system of the Soviet era. Street names and the symbols of the state were changed to show the Romanian heritage of Moldova. After revolts against the pro-Romanian discriminatory policy of the government spread in Transnistria and Gagauzia, he threatened to unleash a civil war similar to that in Lebanon and Ulster.

In May 1991, he was removed from his position after an overwhelming vote of no confidence. After his dismissal he came under scrutiny for questionable financial dealings. He was also accused of promoting subjugation of the Russian speakers.

When asked about the union with Romania, he answered that first, there need to be a few hundred Romanian-Moldovan joint ventures and some tens of thousands of mixed marriages.

He ran as an independent candidate with a single-issue platform of union of Romania and Moldova in the 1992 Romanian presidential election, receiving 326,866 votes (2.75%).

Druc stayed in Romania, where he worked for the Ministry of Foreign Affairs between 2001 and 2004. In 2004 he joined the nationalist Greater Romania Party. He is currently working at the Commerce and Industry Chamber of Romania, involved in projects for trans-border cooperation between Romania, the Republic of Moldova and Ukraine.

In the 2008 Romanian legislative election, Druc ran for a place in the Romanian Parliament in a constituency in Suceava County, being a candidate of the Democratic Liberal Party.

Electoral history

Romanian Presidential elections

External links
Mircea Druc's website

References 

1941 births
Living people
Anti-Russification activists
People from Rîșcani District
Eastern Orthodox Christians from Romania
Moldova State University alumni
Saint Petersburg State University alumni
Romanian people of Moldovan descent
Candidates for President of Romania
Democratic Liberal Party (Romania) politicians
Greater Romania Party politicians
National Patriotic Front (Moldova) politicians
Prime Ministers of Moldova
Popular Front of Moldova MPs
Moldovan MPs 1990–1994
Romanian nationalists